Wandsworth is a London borough in southwest London; it forms part of Inner London and has an estimated population of 329,677 inhabitants. Its main named areas are Battersea, Balham, Putney, Tooting and Wandsworth Town.

The borough borders the London Borough of Lambeth to the east, the London Borough of Merton and the Royal Borough of Kingston upon Thames to the south, the London Borough of Richmond upon Thames to the west, and to the north (across the River Thames) three boroughs, namely the London Borough of Hammersmith and Fulham, the Royal Borough of Kensington and Chelsea and the City of Westminster. The local authority is Wandsworth London Borough Council.

History
Until 1889, the current area of Wandsworth was part of the county of Surrey. In 1855 the Wandsworth District of the Metropolis was formed comprising the parishes of Battersea (excluding Penge), Clapham, Putney, Streatham, Tooting Graveney and Wandsworth. Battersea was removed from the district in 1888. In 1900 the remaining district became the Metropolitan Borough of Wandsworth and Battersea became the Metropolitan Borough of Battersea.

The London Borough of Wandsworth was formed in 1965 from the former area of the Metropolitan Borough of Battersea and the Metropolitan Borough of Wandsworth, but excluding the former parish of Clapham and most of the former parish of Streatham, which were transferred to the London Borough of Lambeth. The areas to the west of Clapham Common in the current borough of Wandsworth are often incorrectly referred to as Clapham, but are in fact part of Battersea parish.

Geography
Clapham Junction railway station is in Battersea, rather than Clapham in the borough. There are many new or refurbished buildings along the borough's prosperous riverside including the large Chelsea Bridge Wharf. The Peace Pagoda, one of many such international pagodas, is in Battersea Park, a sprawling rectangle often hosting circuses beside the Thames. The London Heliport, London's main and busiest heliport, is just beyond Battersea Park, and south of this is New Covent Garden Market. In terms of size, South Thames College, Southside Shopping Centre, Wandsworth and The Exchange Shopping Centre, Putney are among the largest secular structures.

Secular architecturally most highly listed buildings include: Battersea Power Station, the Battersea Arts Centre (formerly town hall), Royal Hospital for Neuro-disability, Wandsworth Town Hall, as well as particularly the interiors of the large Gala Bingo Club, Tooting, the former Granada Theatre, St John's Hill, Clapham Junction by Theodore Komisarjevsky, and in terms of ornate mansions a cluster of five large stone and brick buildings mostly converted to diverse public uses in and around Queen Mary's Hospital, Roehampton at grade II* or above. In Old Battersea two fine masonry mansions survived The Blitz: Old Battersea House  and Downshire House—both hold rare Grade II* status.

Demographics

Population
According to the 2021 census, Wandsworth has a population of 327,506. In 2021, 67.8% of the population was white, 10.1% black and 11.6% Asian.

A 2017 study by Trust for London and the New Policy Institute found that Wandsworth has the lowest rate of unemployment of any London borough. It also has the 2nd lowest rate of local employees who are low-paid.

Ethnicity

Civic affairs

Mayor
The first Mayor of Wandsworth was John Lidiard, elected by the first Wandsworth Borough Council in November 1900. Lidiard's initials are highlighted in the diamonds in the centre of the Mayor's chain of office. The second Mayor was Sir William Lancaster.

The current Mayor is Jane Cooper.

Armorial bearings
The armorial bearings retain many of the features of the arms of the former Metropolitan Borough of Battersea and Metropolitan Borough of Wandsworth.

The fess, or crossing, of the shield is chequered blue and gold representing the arms of William de Warren, created first Earl of Surrey by William Rufus. Each gold square bears a teardrop representing the tears of the French Huguenots, many of whom settled in Wandsworth from 1685.

The ship at the top may refer to the Wendels, a tribe of sea-raiders from the Continent who supposedly gave their name to the district, for Wendelsworth was an early variation of Wandsworth. The four shields and oars on the ship represent the four parishes of Battersea, Putney, Tooting and Wandsworth.

The dove to the left is taken from the former Battersea coat of arms and the black dragon to the right was taken from the former Wandsworth arms and also refers to London, being similar to the City of London coat of arms.

Twin and partner towns

Villers-Plouich,   
The Borough is informally twinned with the village of Villers-Plouich, in Northern France. This association dates back to World War I, following the role played by the Wandsworth Battalion in the liberation of Villers-Plouich in 1917, and again, following recapture, in 1918. Writing in the 'Wandsworth Borough News' in 1920, Robert H Harker, a Lieutenant in the Battalion, described the cemetery in the village as "an inseparable link between our great Borough and that village of Villers-Plouich, near the Somme". 

For his courage and determination during the hostilities, Corporal Edward Foster, of Tooting, was awarded both the Victoria Cross and the Médaille militaire.  A green heritage plaque was unveiled at his former home at Tooting in 2017, and in 2018 a memorial in his name was established on the outskirts of Villers-Plouich. 

Following the end of the War the village was adopted by the then Metropolitan Borough of Wandsworth under the British 'League of Help' scheme, and funds were donated towards its reconstruction. A deputation from Wandsworth regularly visits to commemorate this connection, most recently in 2018.

Schiedam,  
Wandsworth first established a twin town arrangement with Schiedam, in the Netherlands, in 1946. A number of refugees from Schiedam who had lived for a time in Wandsworth during World War II hoped to maintain their connections with the London Borough during peacetime. The twinning was organised within the scope of the Dutch-English Sports Plan. In subsequent years multiple sporting fixtures between teams from the two areas were arranged including football, swimming, gymnastics, korfball (Wandsworth has a korfball club, at Tooting) and cricket (Shiedam is one of the strongholds for cricket in the Netherlands).

For many years the wartime connections were acknowledged during annual Remembrance Day commemorations in the two municipalities, either through an exchange of wreaths or by sending a representative. Within the context of both inter-business exchange and sporting fixtures, visits were also arranged by specific Wandsworth organisations such as Small Electric Motors and the Rediffusion factory, as guests of their counterparts at Schiedam companies such as Wilton Personnel and Pieterman Glass. 

In 1970 a large delegation from Wandsworth visited Schiedam for celebrations marking the 25th anniversary of the town's liberation. Further sporting and cultural exchanges continued through to at least 1977. However, in 1997, an article in the Dutch local press observed that the relationship with Wandsworth had lapsed.

Politics

Wandsworth London Borough Council

Wandsworth is administered by 58 councillors. After the May 2022 election, 35 of these councillors were Labour and 22 were Conservatives, with 1 independent. The Conservatives had had an overall majority on the council since 1978 until Labour won control in the 2022 election.

Summary results of elections

Westminster Parliament
The borough contains three parliamentary constituencies:

 Battersea
 Putney
 Tooting

Transport

Bridges
Five bridges join Wandsworth to the three London Boroughs on the north side of the Thames (from downstream following the river up):

 Chelsea Bridge
 Albert Bridge
 Battersea Bridge
 Wandsworth Bridge
 Putney Bridge

There are also a number of bridges crossing the River Wandle which runs through the centre of Wandsworth town and divides the borough in two.

National Rail Stations
Clapham Junction
Earlsfield
Putney
Battersea Park
Balham
Wandsworth Common
Tooting (on border with London Borough of Merton)
Queenstown Road (Battersea)
Wandsworth Town

Tube Stations
On the Northern line:
Battersea Power Station
Clapham South
Balham
Tooting Bec
Tooting Broadway
On the District line:
East Putney
Southfields

National Rail services are operated from London Waterloo by South Western Railway to Earlsfield, Putney, Queenstown Road (Battersea), Wandsworth Town and the borough's largest station, Clapham Junction. This last station is also served from London Victoria by Southern as are Balham, Battersea Park and Wandsworth Common.

London Overground services mainly serve Clapham Junction, which is the southern terminus for the West London Line that has services to Stratford via Shepherd's Bush, though some trains terminate at the West London Line's northern terminus at Willesden Junction. The western terminus for the East London Line also is at Clapham Junction that has services to Highbury & Islington via Denmark Hill. There is also a limited one train a day parliamentary train service that terminates at Battersea Park instead of Clapham Junction.

London Underground services are provided on the District line to East Putney and Southfields and on the Northern line to Battersea Power Station, Balham, Clapham South, Tooting Bec and Tooting Broadway.

Cycling and walking 
Wandsworth London Borough Council and Transport for London (TfL) maintain cycling infrastructure in the Borough.

Cycle Superhighway 7 (CS7) is an unbroken, signposted cycle route running through the southeastern portion of the Borough. The route runs along the A24 and A3 roads, through Tooting, Balham, and Clapham. Northbound the route links the Borough directly to the City of London via Kennington, Elephant and Castle, and Southwark. Southbound, the route runs unbroken to Colliers Wood.

Cycle Superhighway 8 (CS8) is an unbroken, signposted cycle route running through the northern edge of Wandsworth, through Battersea. The route runs east-west along the A3205/Battersea Park Road, but the route leaves the Borough to the north over Chelsea Bridge. The route begins in Wandsworth Town and runs to Millbank, City of Westminster, passing Chelsea and the Tate Britain en route.

Although CS8 leaves the Borough to the north, cycling infrastructure is provided along the entire A3205 route between Wandsworth Town and Nine Elms. This means that there is a continuous, signposted cycle route - primarily along designated cycle lanes - from Wandsworth Town and Battersea to Vauxhall, Lambeth, and the South Bank.

Quietway 4 (Q4) runs from Clapham Common to Earlsfield in the Borough, through Wandsworth Common.

The Wandle Trail is a shared-use trail for cyclists and pedestrians between Wandsworth Town and Waddon. The route is signposted and mainly traffic-free. It runs through Earlsfield, Colliers Wood, Morden, Mitcham, and Carshalton along the way.

The Santander Cycles bike-sharing system operates in Putney, Wandsworth Town, and Battersea.

Travel to work

In March 2011, the main forms of transport that residents used to travel to work were (of all residents aged 16–74):
 underground, metro, light rail, tram, 20.7% ; 
 train, 10.6%; 
 driving a car or van, 10.6%; 
 bus, minibus or coach, 9.7%; 
 on foot, 5.6%; 
 bicycle, 5.4%; 
 work mainly at or from home, 4.0%.

Education

Whitelands College was founded Chelsea in 1842 by the Church of England, and heavily under the influence of John Ruskin. In 1930/1931 the college relocated to West Hill (Wandsworth Borough) and occupied an enormous purpose-built site, with buildings designed by Sir Giles Gilbert Scott. These buildings, now listed, were one of the Borough's largest educational sites until 2005 when the College, again moved, this time to a site in Roehampton, where it is now a constituent College of Roehampton University.

The borough's schools include Emanuel School, Graveney School, Southfields Academy, Burntwood School, Ashcroft Technology Academy, Ernest Bevin Academy, Ark Bolingbroke Academy and Ark Putney Academy.

Religion
The dominant religion of the borough is Christianity, although the area is also home to a number of other religious communities. The community is home to a number of Sikhs, Jews, Muslims, Buddhists and Hindus.

According to the 2011 Census, approximately 35% of Wandsworth identified as being non-religious, or chose not to state their faith.

The following shows the religious identity of residents residing in Wandsworth according to the 2001, 2011 and the 2021 censuses.

Places

Parks and open spaces
Wandsworth has responsibility for three Metropolitan Open Spaces:

 Battersea Park
 Wandsworth Common
 Tooting Commons – the historically separate, but adjoining, Tooting Bec Common and Tooting Graveney Common

These three large green spaces together with a range of smaller parks and playgrounds (such as Wandsworth Park) are patrolled by Wandsworth Council's own parks police known from 1984 to 2012 as the Wandsworth Parks Police. From April 2012 the Parks Police team of 23 officers was replaced by a smaller Wandsworth Events Police Service (WEPS) working with a team of 12 Metropolitan Police Officers. This system was deemed unsuccessful, and in 2015 the WEPS was rebranded as Wandsworth Parks and Events Police (WPEP) and returned to full staffing levels of 33 police officers and support officers.

Also within the borough's boundaries are Putney Heath and part of Putney Lower Common, which are managed as part of Wimbledon Common, and the west side of Clapham Common, which is managed by the London Borough of Lambeth.

Theatres
Battersea Arts Centre
Theatre503
Putney Arts Theatre
Tara Arts Theatre

Localities
 Balham
 Battersea
 Earlsfield
 Furzedown
 Nine Elms
 Putney
 Putney Heath
 Putney Vale
 Roehampton
 Southfields
 Streatham Park
 Summerstown
 Tooting
 Tooting Bec/Upper Tooting
 Wandsworth
 West Hill

Postcode areas
SW4 (part), SW8 (part), SW11 (all), SW12 (part), SW15 (part), SW16 (part), SW17 (part), SW18 (part), SW19 (part)

See also
Wandsworth Radio
De Morgan Centre
The Borough of Wandsworth Rifle Club
Wandsworth Museum

References

External links

London Borough of Wandsworth
Wandsworth Radio
The Wandsworth Society
Freecycle Wandsworth
Wandsworth Art Studios

 
1965 establishments in the United Kingdom
Wandsworth
Wandsworth